Jack Harvey (September 9, 1907 – March 13, 1986) was a politician in Wisconsin.

Biography
Harvey was born in Chelsea, Massachusetts. Later, he moved to Racine, Wisconsin.

Career
Harvey went to the University of Wisconsin–Madison and worked in factories and restaurants. He served on the Racine Common Council. Harvey was a member of the Wisconsin State Assembly from 1937 to 1940 on the Wisconsin Progressive Party ticket. In 1948 and 1950, he was candidate for the United States House of Representatives from Wisconsin's 1st congressional district, losing to incumbent Lawrence H. Smith both times. Harvey was a Democrat. He served in the United States Army during World War II. He died in 1986.

References

Politicians from Chelsea, Massachusetts
Politicians from Racine, Wisconsin
Military personnel from Wisconsin
Democratic Party members of the Wisconsin State Assembly
Wisconsin city council members
Wisconsin Progressives (1924)
1907 births
1986 deaths
20th-century American politicians